Ronald Rand is an American stage and film actor, educator, director, playwright, librettist, producer, and newspaper publisher. A U.S. Cultural Goodwill Ambassador, founder and publisher of the newspaper, The Soul of the American Actor, he is also the author of Create: How Extraordinary People Live to Create and Create to Live, Acting Teachers of America, and Solo Transformation on Stage: A Journey into the Organic Process of the Art of Transformation.

Early life and education
Rand was born and raised in Coral Gables, Florida, and began performing at the Merry-Go-Round Playhouse in Coral Gables at age six, appearing in over 200 children's theatre plays over ten years. Rand graduated from Coral Gables Senior High School. A graduate of New York University Tisch School of the Arts in New York City, he received a Bachelor of Fine Arts, studying with Stella Adler. Two of Rand's classmates were Bill Paxton, for whom Rand wrote monologues to perform in class, and Kate Valk.  Subsequently, Rand also studied with Harold Clurman, Robert Lewis, Joseph Chaikin, with Jerzy Grotowski at Columbia University, and at the Royal Academy of Dramatic Art's summer program in London. Rand began developing his one-man show in 2000, for which he is best known, called "Let It Be Art!"

Career
Rand's odyssey as Harold Clurman began with his first performance of his play, "Let It Be Art" directed by Gregory Abels, at the Sande Shurin Theatre in New York City in 2001. Rand performed his play in three productions Off-Broadway, first at the Sande Shurin Theatre, at the Century Center Theatre under the play's previous title, Clurman, produced by J.C. Compton, the second wife of Harold Clurman, and then by the Mirror Repertory Company at the ArcLight Theatre. Rand made his New York debut in 1978 at the Brooklyn Academy of Music as a member of the cast of Julius Caesar with Richard Dreyfuss, George Rose, Austin Pendleton, René Auberjonois, and Tom Hulce.

Rand's transformation into a 79-year-old Harold Clurman in his play, Let It Be Art! comes through a two-hour transformation process in his dressing room, based on Konstantin Stanislavski's Method of Physical Actions.

Rand has performed in Let It Be Art! in 26 countries and represented the United States in the 8th Theatre Olympics performing in his solo play at the Kamani Auditorium in New Delhi, and Tagore Theatre in Thiruvananthapuram. Rand is the first American to perform in a solo play at the International Bafa Arts Festival in Zimbabwe, Kenya International Theatre Festival at Nairobi's National Theatre, Voices of History International Theatre Festival in Vologda, Russia, MerCoSur Interior Althuapua De Cioppo International Festival in Paysandú, Uruguay, Bareilly International Theatre Festival, India, Baptizer International Theatre Festival in Bangalore, India, San Vicente del Caguán Cultural Arts Center in northern Colombia, Patravadi Theatre in Bangkok, Trade Unions Palace of Culture in Minsk, Belarus, Palace Dar el-Makhzen in the Kasbah, Tangier, Morocco, and Cayman National Cultural Foundation Harquail National Theatre in the British West Indies. Rand has performed his solo play in the International Theatre Festival for Peace in Barrancabermeja, Colombia, Kathmandu International Theatre Festival in Nepal, Act Alone Festival in Suðureyri, Iceland, as a Festival judge and performed in the M.E.S.S. International Theatre Festival at the Chamber 55 Theatre, Colombo International Theater Festival in Sri Lanka, International Winter Festival in Sarajevo, Bosnia & Herzegovina, Chevolek International Theatre Festival in Chelyabinsk, Russia, Georgia International Theatre Festival in Tbilisi, Georgia, Slavija International Theatre Festival in Belgrade, Serbia, and in the Inaugural Harold Clurman Festival of Arts in New York City. Rand has completed five goodwill tours across India, performing his solo play and teaching his master acting workshop at universities and festivals including Rangayana Theatre in Mysore, Manipal University in Jaipur, at Christ University as a Festival judge and performed in Baptizer International Theatre Festival in Bangalore, AddLife Caring Minds Wellness Centre in Kolkata, Jawaharlal Nehru University, Chilsag Chilies Acting Academy, and R.K. Film and TV Media Academy in New Delhi, Anupam Kher's Actor Prepares Academy in Mumbai, University of Calicut, Pondicherry University, Sri Aurobindo Auditorium in Auroville, and appeared in Great Mind at Work, a play by the India playwright, Sachin Gupta, at L'Alliance française de Delhi, performing in Hindi, a language he does not speak.

Rand starred as Harry in Luv at The Barnstormers Theatre in Tamworth, New Hampshire, as The Stage Manager in the 75th Anniversary production of Our Town (2013), as Captain Keller in The Miracle Worker opposite Marla Schaffel (2014), and as Polonius in Hamlet opposite Nicole Ansari (2015), in Vermont at the Greensboro Arts Alliance Summer Stock Theatre in Greensboro, Vermont. Rand brought to life Charles Dickens in "An Evening With Charles Dickens Reading A Christmas Carol at the 8th Annual Dickens Feast at the Tuscumbia Roundhouse in Tuscumbia, Alabama, acting as more than a dozen characters in a new adaptation he created and directed (2018). Rand performed in a new solo play he created, "The Tuscumbia I Know: A Talk by Captain Keller" playing Captain A.H. Keller at the Helen Keller Library as part of The Helen Keller Festival in Tuscumbia, Alabama, Helen Keller's birthplace (2017–2019). Rand's film appearances include opposite Yoko Ono in her film Homeless (1989), Family Business (1989), Reversal of Fortune (1990), "The Return of Superfly" (1990), Another You (1991), The Hard Way (1991), The Super (1991), Six Degrees of Separation (1993) The Jerky Boys (1995), The Royal Tenenbaums (2001) and Garden State (2004). Rand was cast by Aaron Russo as President Richard Nixon in Rude Awakening (1989), by Robert Redford in Quiz Show (1994) opposite Ralph Fiennes and Paul Scofield, and as a business magnate opposite Anjelica Huston in When in Rome (2010). Rand appeared as Milton Sterns in A Marriage: O'Keeffe and Stieglitz opposite Christopher Plummer and Jane Alexander on PBS American Playhouse (1991) Rand appeared as the Judge in a KRS-One video produced by Boogie Down Productions (1987).

Educator 
The J. William Fulbright Foreign Scholarship Board and The Bureau of Educational and Cultural Affairs chose Rand as a Fulbright Specialist Scholar during 2021–2025. 
Rand was also chosen as a Fulbright Specialist Scholar during 2013–2018. 
In 2013 he became the first Fulbright Specialist Scholar to teach at the University of Sarajevo's Academy of Dramatic Arts, University of Tuzla Academy of Dramatic Arts, Mostar Youth Theatre, and the Druga Gimnazija, an IB World School in Sarajevo. In 2015, he became the first Fulbright Specialist Scholar to teach at the University of Malaya Cultural Centre Drama Department in Kuala Lumpur, Malaysia. Rand was the first American invited by the Jabatan Kebudayaan dan Kesenian Negara, known as the Malaysian Ministry of Tourism and Culture – National Department for Culture & Arts to teach and perform at Malaysia's JKKN State Theaters in Ipoh, Alor Setar and Kuala Terengganu. In Kuala Lumpur, Rand was invited to teach and perform at the National Arts Culture and Heritage Academy Aswara, Islamic International University Malaysia, Universiti Teknologi MARA, and to teach at the Penang Temple of Fine Arts Academy. In 2017 he became the first Fulbright Specialist Scholar to teach four 7-hour master acting workshops using Constantin Stanislavsky's "Method of Physical Actions" chart at the Taller de Teatro in Paysandu, Uruguay, and taught two workshops for ages nine to fifteen at the Family Instituto y Colegio de Inglés in Paysandu, performed in his solo play, and directed an adaptation of the play, Our Town by Thornton Wilder in Spanish with Spanish actors. He was an Adjunct Professor of Acting and Directing at Pace University in New York City for four years, an Adjunct professor of Acting at Northern Illinois University, and Adjunct Professor of Theatre History at the University of North Alabama. He has brought his solo play and Art of Transformation Master Acting Workshop to 26 countries and 20 states, including Gonzaga University, Western Washington University, University of Missouri in Columbia, University of Alaska, Syracuse University, Lycoming College, Louisiana State University, University of Zagreb Academy of Dramatic Art – Croatia, Anadolu University in Eskisehir, Turkey, University of the Visual and Performing Arts – Colombo, Sri Lanka, Shota Rustaveli Theatre and Film University – Tbilisi, Georgia, Belarusian State University – Minsk, Belarus, National Theatre of British West Indies – Cayman National Cultural Foundation, IB World School – Sarajevo, Bosnia & Herzegovina, National School of the Arts in Johannesburg, South Africa, Auroville – India, at several community theaters across America, and at the Joint Personnel Recovery Agency – Fairchild U.S. Air Force Base. Rand, an acrylic painter, had originally studied at the Arts Student League in New York City in the late 1970s, gave a talk and painting demonstration on bark for The Shoals Artists Guild at the Kennedy Douglass Center for the Arts, in the Arts Alive Festival, Florence, Alabama in 2019. His artworks were on display in the Mostly Blues Exhibit at Kennedy-Douglass Center for the Arts, Florence, Alabama, and in the ArtWorks Exhibit at The Tennessee Valley Art Museum in Tuscumbia, Alabama (2019–2021).

Publisher, author, poet, and librettist
Rand is the founder, publisher and editor-in-chief of the newspaper, The Soul of the American Actor (founded in 1998), the only printed and online newspaper in America dedicated to the artistic process of the actor and the art of theater. Rand has conducted over 1000 interviews including Alec Baldwin, Theodore Bikel, Lee Blessing, Claire Bloom, Kate Burton, Rita Gam, Andre Gregory, George Grizzard, Charles Grodin, A.R. Gurney, Marcia Gay Harden, Kitty Carlisle Hart, Geoffrey Holder, Celeste Holm, Anjelica Huston, Valerie Harper, Ruben Santiago-Hudson, Judith Ivey, Kevin Kline, Jackie Mason, Terrence Mann, Lloyd Richards, Cliff Robertson, Maureen Stapleton, Peter Weller, and Elie Wiesel. Essays have included those by Stella Adler, Edward Albee, Harold Clurman, Eugenio Barba, William Esper, Jerzy Grotowski, James Earl Jones, Laurence Luckinbill, Sanford Meisner, Arthur Miller, and Lee Strasberg. Rand is the author of three books. Create! How Extraordinary People Live to Create and Create to Live, Finalist for the Indies Book of the Year Awards for Performing Arts & Music and Finalist in the 12th Annual National Indie Excellence Awards, is a collection of over 100 interviews exploring the creative process of many of the world's most acclaimed actors, actresses, artists, choreographers, composers & lyricists, dancers, directors, educators, musicians, playwrights, poets, singers, and writers of our time, including Carol Burnett, Ellen Burstyn, Martha Carpenter, Dick Cavett, Brian Cox, Ossie Davis, Ruby Dee, Katherine Dunham, Michael Frayn, Kelsey Grammer, Joel Grey, Marvin Hamlisch, Julie Harris, Chaka Khan, Odile Gakire Katese, Everett Raymond Kinstler, Stephen Lang, Jane Maxwell, Patricia Neal, Jerry Orbach, Christopher Plummer, Luise Rainer, Tony Randall, Phylicia Rashad, Chita Rivera, Apriana Taylor, Ben Vereen, Sir Derek Walcott, Robert Wilson, and Eugenia Zukerman. His second book is Acting Teachers of America with interviews of one hundred influential acting teachers, actors, and directors in America, including Anne Bogart, Steve Buscemi, Olympia Dukakis, Zelda Fichandler, James Gandolfini, Gene Hackman, Michael Howard, William Hurt, Michael Kahn, Milton Katselas, Laura Linney, Edward Norton, Sidney Poitier, and Terry Schreiber. Rand's third book, Solo Transformation on Stage: A Journey into the Organic Process of the Art of Transformation, includes a Foreword by Stephen Lang, Ronald Rand's two-hour transformation into Harold Clurman, Rand's personal experiences with his teachers, Stella Adler, Harold Clurman, and Jerzy Grotowski, life-changing ‘moments of depth’ from some of the world's memorable performers including Cicely Tyson, Paul Robeson, Ira Aldridge, James Earl Jones, Sidney Poitier, John Barrymore, Laurette Taylor, and Marlon Brando, and over twenty interviews including Christopher Plummer, Eve Ensler, Ben Vereen, Billy Crudup, Adrienne Barbeau, Olympia Dukakis, Hershey Felder, Marga Gomez, Spalding Gray, Stephen Lang, Tony Lo Bianco, Laurence Luckinbill, Angelica Page, Elizabeth van Dyke, Jean-Claude van Itallie, and Julie Harris.As a poet, Rand's poetry appeared in Where the Mind Dwells: Salvation, and in Huntsville Literary Association's magazine, Poem. Rand created the libretto for a new opera, IBSEN, about the final days of Henrik Ibsen, opera score by German composer, Hartmut von Lieres.

Director and producer
In 2013 Rand became the second U.S. director to direct in the 60-year history of the historic Chamber Theatre 55 in Sarajevo, Bosnia & Herzegovina. The set and costumes were designed by Vanja Popovic. The production continues to be performed as part of the theatre repertory, and has traveled to Montenegro, Slovenia, Croatia, and across Bosnia & Herzegovina, winning awards in state festivals.Rand became the first American director to direct at the Aras Theatre in Paysandu, Uruguay. He directed an adaptation from the Pulitzer Prize winning play, Our Town by Thornton Wilder translated by Ilse Olivera into Spanish, (a language he does not speak), with actors of Paysandu. Rand produced and co-translated the American premiere of Spanish playwright, Inigo Ramirez de Haro's most controversial play, "We Couldn't Call It What We Wanted To Call It, So We Called It Holy Crap!!" starring Stephen Mo Hanan at La MaMa, E.T.C. directed by Erica Gould in New York City in 2011. Rand directed and appeared in A Meltdown from Chernobyl, The Oral History of a Nuclear Disaster by Svetlana Alexievich, a dramatic adaptation by Spencer Smith with Frances Crowe, Ruth Hooke, Sister Jane Morrissey, and Jean-Claude van Itallie across northern New England at churches and meeting houses. Rand created and moderated a Drama Desk Panel Event, The Art of Storytelling, at Sardi's Restaurant in New York City, interviewing Bertie Carvel, Jayne Houdyshell, Kristine Nielsen, and David Hyde-Pierce.

References

External links

21st-century American male actors
Year of birth missing (living people)
Living people
American male stage actors
People from Coral Gables, Florida